Punchana is the capital of the Punchana District in the Maynas Province of the Loreto Region in northeastern Peru, in the Peruvian Amazon Jungle. It is a neighborhood on the outskirts of the city of Iquitos, located on the Amazon and the Nanay Rivers.   

Populated places in the Loreto Region
Populated places on the Amazon